Albert William Greenup was Principal of London College of Divinity from 1899 to 1925. He was widely known as a scholar of Hebrew and other Biblical languages, and published widely on Hebrew religious texts. He worked on the second edition of the Revised Version of the English Bible, published in 1910.

He also acted as an examiner in theology at Cambridge, London in Hebrew, New Testament Greek, Syriac, and ecclesiastical history.

He was appointed as Rector of Great Oakley in 1925 to 1931, and Professor of Biblical Languages at the Bible Churchmen's Missionary College, Bristol from 1932 to 1947.

He married Evelyn Helen Heron on 3 September 1895 in Oxford.

He died near Basingstoke in 1952, aged 85.

References 

1886 births
1952 deaths
20th-century British theologians